This list includes all architectural projects realized by Friedensreich Hundertwasser including new buildings, alterations and design of buildings.

Hundertwasser started to work as an architect at the age of 55 already having a reputation as a painter. According to the views of the artist, every person is entitled to decorate his house. Hundertwasser's architecture differs from functionalism and rationalism typical of the 20th century, by his use of bright colors, decorations, distorted lines and the desire to be in harmony with nature. Hundertwasser believed that only a few buildings are "healthy." He made numerous restructuring and renewal of residential and functional buildings and had a reputation as "the doctor of architecture" because he treated buildings by decorating them in order to diminish the visual pollution of the environment. The largest architectural project of  Friedensreich Hundertwasser is the hotel complex Rogner Bad Blumau in Austria, completed in 1997.

Bibliography 
 Pierre Restany: Die Macht der Kunst, Hundertwasser. Der Maler-König mit den fünf Häuten. Taschen, Köln 1998, .
 Wieland Schmied: Hundertwasser 1928-2000. Persönlichkeit, Leben, Werk. Taschen, Köln 2009, .
 Hundertwasser Architektur – Für ein natur- und menschengerechteres Bauen. Köln: Taschen, 2006.

External links

 www.hundertwasser.at

Hundertwasser